Lisa Milne (born 22 April 1971 in Aberdeen) is a Scottish soprano described by the BBC as "one of RSAMD's best-known alumni", who was among the first artists to be invited to the BBC Radio 3 New Generation Artists scheme in 1999-2001.

Known for her work as a member of the King's Consort and her recordings with Roger Vignoles, Iain Burnside, Malcolm Martineau and others. She has performed at the Edinburgh Festival and the BBC Proms.

The Scottish soprano Lisa Milne studied at the Royal Scottish Academy of Music and Drama. She was
awarded an MBE in the Queen’s Birthday Honours in 2005. She was also awarded honorary doctorates
by the University of Aberdeen and Robert Gordon's University. A renowned recitalist, she has appeared
at Edinburgh and City of London festivals, London’s Wigmore Hall. She is regularly partnered by Malcolm Martineau with whom she has performed and recorded a variety of repertoire.
 
In opera, her appearances have included Pamina (Die Zauberflöte) and Susanna (Le nozze di Figaro) at
the Metropolitan Opera, New York and Pamina, Marzelline (Fidelio), Micäela (Carmen) and the title roles
in Rodelinda and Theodora at the Glyndebourne Festival. Her many roles at the English National Opera
have included Contessa (Le nozze di Figaro), the title role in Alcina and Anne Trulove (The Rake’s
Progress). At the Welsh National Opera she created the role of Sian in the world premiere of James
MacMillan’s opera The Sacrifice.
 
Highlights have included appearances with the Boston
Symphony Orchestra and Levine, the Berlin Philharmonic with Rattle, the Rotterdam Philharmonic
Orchestra with Gergiev, the Dresden Staatskapelle with Ticciati, the Seoul Philharmonic Orchestra with
Chung, the London Philharmonic Orchestra with Jurowski, the Budapest Festival Orchestra with Fischer
and the New York and Vienna Philharmonic Orchestras with Harding.
Lisa also sang in concert with Jose Carreras at the reopening of The Usher Hall,Edinburgh with the BBC
SSO and again with Carerras at The Royal Albert Hall.
She has recorded the songs of Marjory Kennedy Fraser, as well as Vivaldi and Handel with The King’s Consort for Hyperion, Idomeneo and La
Clemenza di Tito under Mackerras, French Song with Iain Burnside and Poulenc and Debussy with
Martineau.
 
She also played The Governess in the award winning BBC film of 'Turn of the Screw' by Britten directed
by Katie Mitchell (2005 Opus Arte) which won Winner Best Fiction Film - Vienna TV and Micaela on the
Glyndebourne DVD of 'Carmen' directed by Sir David MacVicar.

Lisa currently teaches at the Aberdeen City Music School

References

Alumni of the Royal Conservatoire of Scotland
Scottish sopranos
1971 births
Living people
BBC Radio 3 New Generation Artists
21st-century Scottish women singers
20th-century Scottish women singers